Imam Al-Tayeb Mosque, is located in Abu Dhabi, the capital city of the United Arab Emirates. The mosque is named after the Grand Imam of Al-Azhar, Ahmed Mohamed Ahmed El-Tayeb. It is a part of the larger Abrahamic Family House complex.

Architecture 
The mosque's exterior is characterized by seven arches, which reflect the significance of the number seven in Islam. The interior of the mosque features nine ascending vaults, each rising to form a sail vault at their apex. The mosque's design incorporates Islamic geometric designs throughout the structure, with a mashrabiya screen made up of more than 470 operable panels that regulate light and air while preserving the privacy of those inside.

The interior of the mosque is carpeted in gray, with two microphones beneath the floor and one above on the minbar, where the imam stands for Friday prayers. Moveable walls separate the men's and women's sections. The mosque is oriented towards Mecca, and includes shelves for the Quran.

History 
The idea for the Abrahamic Family House, which includes the Imam Al-Tayeb Mosque, was announced on February 5, 2019, by Sheikh Abdullah bin Zayed, the Minister of Foreign Affairs and International Co-operation, during a meeting of the Higher Committee of Human Fraternity at the New York Public Library. The goal of the Abrahamic Family House is to promote interfaith understanding and dialogue between different religions.

The mosque is named after Ahmed Mohamed Ahmed El-Tayeb, the Grand Imam of Al-Azhar. El-Tayeb is known for his efforts to promote interfaith dialogue and peaceful coexistence between different religions.

The inaugural Friday prayer was held at Imam Al-Tayeb Mosque on 17 February 2023, marking the first time the community was welcomed inside one of the three houses of worship.

See also 

 Abrahamic Family House
 Document on Human Fraternity

External links 

 Official website

References

Mosques in Abu Dhabi
Culture in Abu Dhabi
Abrahamic Family House